The Outrage, also known as At the Gate of the Ghost, is a 2011 Thai Drama movie starring Mario Maurer, Ananda Everingham, Pongpat Wachirabunjong, Dome Heathakun and Petchtai Wongkamlao. This movie was released in Thailand on September 11, 2011. This movie was directed by M.L. Pundhevanop Devakula.the movie internationally release in Europe and Asia like Russia, Lithuania, Germany, Ukraine, Poland, Malaysia, Singapore, China, Georgia, Vietnam and Shan State. It is adapted from a play "Rashomon" by M.R. Kukrit Pramoj, which itself is also an adaptation of a Japanese short story by Ryūnosuke Akutagawa, In a Grove.

Plot
In the wake of a heated murder trial, a young monk seeks refuge from a storm in a deserted burial tunnel, where a conversation with a poor man and a beggar reveals three distinctly different versions of the events leading up to the killing. A warlord has been murdered, and as the trial gets underway the testimonies of his wife, the bandit Singh Khan and a shaman with the power to call on the victim's spirit only serve to obscure the truth, rather than clarifying it. Deeply perplexed after hearing all of the testimonies, a young monk embarks on a journey to seek his father's counsel as a storm blows in. A nearby burial tunnel provides a place to rest until the storm has passed. In the process of seeking shelter, the monk crosses paths with a common man who also testified at the trial. Later, the two men are joined by an elderly beggar who engages them both in a heated discussion about the trial. Over the course of their conversation, the stories of the wife, the bandit, and the shaman are all recounted in great detail, revealing the personal agendas of all three. Later, as the stories draw to a close and the clouds begin to clear, the troubled young monk grows increasingly perplexed by the nature of the truth not only as it applies to the trial, but the very core of his belief system as well.

Cast
Mario Maurer as Monk
Petchtai Wongkamlao as Woodcutter
Pongpat Wachirabunjong as Undertaker
Ananda Everingham as Warlord
Laila Boonyasak as Warlord's Wife
Dom Hetrakul as Thief

See also 
 Rashomon, a 1950 Japanese film with the same narrative structure

References

External links
 

Thai drama films
Remakes of Thai films